The Cornish Crabber 24 is a series of British trailerable sailboats, designed by Roger Dongray as cruisers and first built in 1974.

Production
The design has been built by Cornish Crabbers in Wadebridge, Cornwall, United Kingdom since 1974. It has passed through five marks with the Mark V remaining in production.

Design
The Cornish Crabber 24 series are all recreational sailboats, originally built from wood, they are now predominantly of glassfibre, with wooden trim. The boats are gaff rigged topsail cutters, with plumb stems, angled transoms, bowsprits and keel-hung rudders controlled by a tiller.

The Mark I has sleeping accommodation for four people, with a double "V"-berth in the bow cabin and two straight settee quarter berths in the main cabin. The galley is located on the starboard side just aft of the bow cabin. The galley is equipped with a stove and a sink. The head is located centred in the bow cabin, under the "V"-berth.

Variants
Cornish Crabber 24 Mark I
This model was designed by Roger Dongray and introduced in 1974. It was originally made of marine plywood and later of glassfibre.
Cornish Crabber 24 Mark II
This model displaces  and has a rig with a large area mainsail and a gaff with higher peak angle.
Cornish Crabber 24 Mark III
This model was introduced in the early 1990s and brought a fixed, deeper draft, long keel.
Cornish Crabber 24 Mark IV
Improved model, with the fixed, deeper draft long keel.
Cornish Crabber 24 Mark V
This current production model has a new hull that was designed by Andrew Wolstenholme and a gaff-rigged mainsail, a staysail and a jib. The boat is fitted with a Japanese Yanmar 2YM15 diesel engine. The fuel tank holds .

Operational history
The boat is supported by an active class club, the Cornish Crabbers Club.

In a 2010 review of the Mark I and II Steve Henkel wrote, "The Cornish Crabber can be ordered in a variety of permutations. One choice is the rig: either (A) a gaff-headed mainsail with a standard topsail flying over it (top sailplan), which permits quick sail reduction when the wind pipes up, just by striking the topsail; or (B) the 'Mark II,' a rig with a larger main and a higher peaked gaff (bottom sailplan), which is more efficient to windward and in light air (but still not as efficient as a Marconi rig). The Mk II has 600 Ibs. more displacement (compared to the base case of 4,600 lbs.) and a couple of inches difference in some dimensions (i.e., the Mk II sits 2 inches deeper in the water, making bridge clearance 2 inches less). Outboard power (8 hp recommended) or a 10 hp Yanmar diesel are also choices. Best features: As a character boat, the Cornish Crabber is hard to beat. But you have to like 'pulling a lot of strings,' that is, halyards, sheets, reef lines, and so on. Worst features: In light air the boat's weight is a bit too much for her sail area, with either rig. Not to put too fine an edge on it, in light air she’s slow. (Note high PHRF.)"

In a 2017 review Jack Hornor wrote, "the Cornish Crabber 24 is a handsome little yacht, which will get attention wherever she sails, and its fair to assume that owners and admirers of this classic take considerable pride in their boats."

See also
List of sailing boat types

References

External links

1970s sailboat type designs
Sailing yachts
Trailer sailers
Sailboat types built by Cornish Crabbers
Sailboat type designs by Roger Dongray